Cyperus niveoides is a species of sedge that occurs in Cameroon, Zambia and the Republic of the Congo.

The species was first formally described by the botanist Charles Baron Clarke in 1901.

See also
 List of Cyperus species

References

niveoides
Taxa named by Charles Baron Clarke
Plants described in 1901
Flora of Cameroon
Flora of Zambia
Flora of the Republic of the Congo